Us Against Them is the debut studio album by American rapper Jake Miller. It was released on November 5, 2013, through Entertainment One Music. It debuted and peaked at number 26 on the US Billboard 200.

Critical reception
Gregory Heaney of AllMusic said "While the album would never be accused of being edgy, it has a catchy streak a mile long. Breezy, laid-back, and effervescent, Us Against Them is a rap album built more for summer drives than dancefloor-busting house parties, and its pulsing beats and wistful lyricism make this an album destined for road trip mixes."

Track listing

Notes
 signifies a remixer.

Credits and personnel
Credits for Us Against Them have been obtained from the album's liner notes.

Jake Miller - composer, vocals, executive producer
The Fliptones - composer, producer, recording
Jeremy Thurber - composer, vocals
Tekneek - composer, producer
Tiffany Vartanyan - composer, vocals
Tyler Nicolo - composer, producer
Big Jerm - composer, producer
Sayez - composer, producer
The80Two - composer, producer
Traptain Morgan - remixer
Roc The Command - composer, producer

Mista Raja - composer, producer
TAB - vocals
Marc Karmatz - mixer, recording
James Royo - mixer, recording
Robert Vazquez - mixer
Frank Harris - executive producer, management, A&R
Natasha Lees - A&R admin
Marc Stollman - legal
Chris Gehringer - mastering
Edgar Esteves - photography

Charts

References

2013 debut albums
Jake Miller (singer) albums
E1 Music albums